Chattogram Water and Sewerage Authority or, abbreviated as Chattogram WASA is a Bangladesh government service agency under the Ministry of Local Government, Rural Development and Co-operatives responsible for providing water and sewerage facilities to residents of Chattogram. A.K.M. Fazlullah is the managing director of Chattogram Water and Sewerage Authority.

History
Chattogram Water Supply and Sewerage Authority was established in 1963. In 1996, through the passage of Water and Sewerage Authority Act, the authority was reformed and renamed to Water and Sewerage Authority. Through it is mandated to provide sewage and water supply to Chittagong City, it currently only provides water while sewage services are provided by Chittagong City Corporation. In 2019, WASA was losing 90 million taka per year in revenue due to illegal extraction of water.

CHattogram WASA opened a call center in March 2019 for its customers. On 2 April 2019, the Chattogram WASA announced plans to install two hundred fire hydrants financed by Japan International Cooperation Agency.

Criticism
Chattogram WASA has faced criticism for water loss along the pipelines and shortage of supplies as a result. The water supply system lost almost 40 percent of the water it carried in 2010. In January 2017, WASA pipelines had 250 leaks which were yet to be repaired. Chittagong city also experiences flooding due to the mismanagement of water.

References

1963 establishments in East Pakistan
Organisations based in Chittagong
Government agencies of Bangladesh
Water management authorities in Bangladesh